Cuentos de ayer y de hoy is the debut album by the Spanish hard and folk rock band Ñu released in October 1978.

This album features a progressive rock style combining hard and folk rock. The flute predominance in the album's sound has been compared with Jethro Tull's style, but playing a way heavier sound it is in fact a predecessor of folk metal. Regarded as one of the best Spanish progressive rock albums, it has been issued in Spain, Japan and South Korea. 
The Spanish magazine Efe Eme ranked Cuentos de ayer y de hoy as the 148th best Spanish rock album ever.

Track listing

Personnel 
 José Carlos Molina – Vocals, flute, keyboards, harmonica, percussion, concertina
 Enrique Ballesteros – Drums, percussion
 José Mª García – Guitar, mellotron
 Jorge Calvo – Bass
 Jean François André – violin, baton
 Mariscal Romero – producer

References

External links 
 José Carlos Molina official website (in Spanish)
 Profile on Rateyourmusic

1978 albums
Spanish-language albums